List of the Toronto Blue Jays franchise home run leaders with 50 or more home runs.

(Updated 2022 January 18)

List

References

Home run